Levi Eshkol (1895–1969) was an Israeli statesman who received a number of awards and honors:

National honors
 1965 - Nebraska Admiral
 1965 - National Order of Chad
 1966 - National Order of the Ivory Coast (Grand Cross)
 1966 - Kentucky Colonel
 1966 - National Order of Madagascar (Grand Cross)
 1966 - Order of Ruben Dario, Nicaragua
 1968 - Honorary citizen of Texas
 Order of Mono
 National Order of Dahomey

Honorary citizenships

Israel
 1965 - Tirat Carmel.
 1965 - Kiryat Gat.
 1965 - Nazareth Ilit.
 1965 - Beer Sheva.
 1965 - Beit Shean.
 1965 - Afula.
 1967 - Dimona.
 1968 - Ashdod.
 1968 - Jerusalem.
 1968 - Petach Tikva.

Abroad
 1964 - Philadelphia, Pennsylvania, USA.
 1964 - Chicago, Illinois, USA.

Honorary doctorates
 1964 - Hebrew University of Jerusalem.
 1964 - Roosevelt University, Illinois, USA.
 1964 - Yeshiva University, New York, USA.
 1966 - University of Liberia.
 1968 - Hebrew Union College, New York.

Other distinctions
 1967 - Honorary member of the National Agricultural Workers' Union.

Posthumous
Since 1970, Yad Levi Eshkol is the official organization commemorating prime minister Eshkol.

Numerous national sites have been named after him, some by decision of the Israeli government:
 Eshkol Regional Council in the north-western Negev
 Eshkol National Park
 Eshkol Power Station
 Eshkol Water Filtration Plant, the central water filtration facility of the National Water Carrier of Israel.

Streets and neighborhoods have been named in his honor, among them the Ramat Eshkol neighborhood in Jerusalem. Several schools are also named after him, including HaKfar HaYarok. The Hebrew University of Jerusalem named the Agriculture Faculty in Levi Eshkol's name, as well as established a research institute in his name in the Faculty of Social Sciences.

Notes

Awards
Lists of awards received by person